Hani Mansour M. Al-Mazeedi (born 1954) is a Kuwaiti scientist who specializes in Halal requirements, quality and Safety systems for food (HACCP/Pre-requisite programs such as GMP & GHP) and Halal services for the Halal Industry.

The organization, Mazeedi, through Kuwait government (Ministry of Awqaf and Islamic Affairs and Kuwait Institute for Scientific Research) and GSO (Gulf Standard Organization) of the GCC Cooperation Council for the Arab States of the Gulf, has organized the first gulf conference on the Halal Industry and its Services in January 2011. This was followed by an Halal workshop in 2012, the second and third gulf conference on the Halal Industry and its Services in 2012 and 2013 consequently.

Work and interests

Dr. Hani Mansour M. Al-Mazeedi is a Kuwaiti scientist who specializes since 1980 in Halal requirements for food and non-food products. He is an international speaker in Halal issues, and one of the Halal experts in international Halal meetings of the 1st. OIC Halal meetings in Turkey on Halal international standard. He is also a consultant in Food Safety Management systems (HACCP/Pre-requisite programs & ISO22000). Dr. Mazeedi has passed the exams as a lead auditor in ISO9001, and ISO22000, and has attended an ISO 17025, and ISO 17065 training course. He has obtained his BSc from USA and his PhD from UK and he is an author of a number of books such as: Concepts on Food Hygiene 1998, Practical Guide to Food Safety 2002, and 7 books series on My Food to be published soon entitled: Nutrition, Diets, Food additives, Food, The Halal industry and its services, Food safety, and international food safety. He has a book of four parts entitled “Index of Official papers related to Food and Slaughter according to Islamic Rites, for the period of 1979-2018. He has organized since 2011 through Kuwait government (Ministry of Awqaf and Islamic Affairs and Kuwait Institute for Scientific Research) and GSO (Gulf Standard Organization) of the GCC Cooperation Council for the Arab States of the Gulf few international Gulf conferences on the Halal Industry and its Services in Kuwait. Being an international speaker, Dr. Mazeedi since 1980 has a continuous activities of visiting and delivering presentations on the Halal Industry and its services and food safety systems to a number of countries such as: Australia, Belgium, Brazil, Denmark, Egypt, France, Holland, India, Malaysia, Morocco, New Zealand, Pakistan, Philippine, Poland, Russia, Saudi Arabia, South Africa, Singapore, Spain, Syria, Thailand, Turkey, UAE, USA, and Yemen. For this purpose he has represented Kuwait since 1981 to visit major Halal Certification Bodies in major meat exporting countries of the world. Dr. Mazeedi, in 2009, was a winner of the Halal Journal Award, of Malaysia. Currently, Dr. Mazeedi is running Halal researches in Kuwait screening both food and non-food products for their Halalness for the government of the state of Kuwait in a scientific project funded by Islamic development bank, IDB, and scientifically backed up by Karachi University of Pakistan.

Books

He has published two books in Arabic, beginning with Concepts on Food Hygiene (1998). The second was Practical Guide to Food Safety (2002). This book focused on HACCP and related food safety systems. Seven books about to be published entitled: Nutrition, Diets, Food additives, Food, The Halal industry and its services, Food safety, and international food safety.

Selected works
 Abuknesha, R.A., Al-Mazeedi, H.M. and Price, R. J.S. Reduction of the rate of fluorescence decay of FITC- and carboxyfluorescein stained cells by anti-FITC antibodies, Histochemical Journal (1992) 24:73-77.
 Abuknesha, R.A., Al-Mazeedi, H.M. and Price, R. J.S. AMC-anti-FITC conjugates: Novel reagents for amplified immunochemical techniques: Immunofluorescent staining of human fibroblasts Histochemical Journal (1992) 24:655-662.
 J.M. Al-Sager, J.S. Sidhu and H.M. Al-Mazeedi. Physico-chemical and sensory quality of milk being produced in the state of Kuwait . Adv. Food Sci. (CMTL) Vol. 21 No.1/2, 1-9 (1999).
 U. Beg, M. Al-Mutairi, K. R. Beg, H.M. Al-Mazeedi, and L. N. Ali, T. Saeed. Mycotoxins in poultry feed in Kuwait . Arch. Environ. Contam. Toxicol. 50, 594-602 (2006).
 Husam Alomirah, Hani Al-Mazeedi, Sameer Al-Zenki, Tareq Al-Aati, Jamlah Al-Otaibah, Maha Al-Batel and Jiwan Sidhu. Prevalence of antimicrobial residues in milk and dairy products in the state of Kuwait . Journal of Food Quality. 30 (2007), 745-763.
 S.F. Al-Zenki, H.M. Al-Mazeedi, S.N. Al-Hooti, t. A-Atti, Q. Al-Mutawah, H.F. Alomirah and J.S. Sidhu. Quality and safety charcatertics of milk sold in the state of Kuwait . Journal of Food Processing and Preservation 31, 702-713 (2007).
 S.F. Al-Zenki, H.M. Al-Mazeedi, S.N. Al-Hooti, t. A-Ati, Q. Al-Matawah, and H.F. Alomirah. Characterisation of quality and safety of tomatoes sold in the state of Kuwait. Int. J. Postharvest Technology and Innovation, Vol. 1, No. 3, 2008.
 Hani M. Al-Mazeedi, Alaa B. Abbas, Hussam F. Alomirah, Wafa Y. Al-Jouhar, Siham A. Al-Mufty, Mohamed M. Ezzelregal and Rashed A. Al-Owaish. Screening for tetracycline residues in food products of animal origin in the state of Kuwait using Charm II radio-immunoassy and LC/MS/MS methods. Food Additives and Contaminants. Vol. 27, No. 3, March 2010, 291-301.
 Husam Alomirah, Sameer Al-Zenki, Wajeeh N. Sawaya, Faten Jabsheh, Adnan J. Hussain, Hani Al-Mazeedi, Dina Al-Kandari, David Jukes. Assessment of the food control system in the state of Kuwait. Food Control, 21 (2010) 496-504.

See also
 Islamic dietary laws

References

 (in Arabic) [1] (in French) Interview with Dr Hani Mansour M Al-Mazeedi : Paradoxically, the halal standards go against the consumer, on asidcom.org
 McHalal system, by Dr Hani M. Al Mazeedi
 The Halal Journal Awards 2009 (Award for Outstanding Personal Achievement in the Halal Industry 2009)
 (in Arabic) The Dr Hani Al-Mazeedi obtains an award during the World Halam Forum 2009 (arrouiah.com)
 Photo of award on alma
 zeedi-family.com
 Practical Guide for Food Safety: The Fundamentals of Production, Preparation, and Usage of Safe and Healthy Food (Arabic) - H. Al-Mazeedi, Reviewed by A. Mesaiker and Y. Al-Shayji - KISR Book

External links
Kuwait Institute for Scientific Research
Personal blog of Dr. Mazeedi

1954 births
Living people
Food scientists

Kuwaiti scientists